Ismael Enrique Alvarado Quiñones (born 22 October 1980) is a retired Peruvian footballer who plays as a central defender. He currently plays for Sport Victoria in the Peruvian Segunda División.

International career
Ismael Alvarado made his debut for Peru in a 0–2 friendly loss to Japan on March 24, 2007.

Honours

Club
Alianza Lima
Torneo Descentralizado champions: 2006

Los Caimanes
Peruvian Segunda División champions: 2013

References

External links

Ismael Alvarado at csldata.sports.sohu.com 

1980 births
Living people
Footballers from Lima
Peruvian footballers
Peru international footballers
Peruvian Primera División players
Sporting Cristal footballers
Cienciano footballers
Estudiantes de Medicina footballers
Coronel Bolognesi footballers
Club Alianza Lima footballers
Guangzhou F.C. players
Club Deportivo Universidad César Vallejo footballers
Cobresol FBC footballers
Sport Huancayo footballers
José Gálvez FBC footballers
Peruvian expatriate footballers
Peruvian expatriate sportspeople in China
Expatriate footballers in China
Association football central defenders
Chinese Super League players